Guy Junior Nke Ondoua (born 30 August 1986) is a Cameroonian-born Indonesian professional footballer who plays as a forward for Liga 2 club Sriwijaya.

Club career

TSW Pegasus
Ondoua scored twice against Tuen Mun Progoal. He helped TSW Pegasus win the title by scoring two goals in the final against Sun Hei and was TSW Pegasus' leading goal scorer in the 2008-09 Hong Kong Senior Challenge Shield. But he was let go to make room for Masayuki Okano, a more marketable player.

Tai Po FC
Previously he played for Hong Kong First Division club Tai Po during the 2010–11 season. On 23 May 2011, he scored a hat-trick for Tai Po against Tuen Mun in their 7:1 victory.

Biu Chun Rangers
Ondoua signed for Biu Chun Rangers on 14 September 2011. He made 17 league appearances and scored 2 goals for Biu Chun Rangers.

Persiwa Wamena
In 2013, Guy Junior signed a one-year contract with Persiwa Wamena. He made his debut on 13 January 2013 in a match against Persita Tangerang. On 31 January 2013, Guy Junior scored his first goal for Persiwa against Persela Lamongan in the 81st minute at the Pendidikan Stadium, Wamena.

PSS Sleman
In 2014, Guy Junior signed a contract with Liga Indonesia Premier Division club PSS Sleman. He made 22 league appearances and scored 11 goals for PSS Sleman.

Madura United
He was signed for Madura United to play in Indonesia Soccer Championship A in the 2016 season.

Bhayangkara
After his contract was terminated by Madura United, on 30 April 2017, Ondoua signed for Bhayangkara. He was chosen by the club's coach because he's believed to be able to strengthen the club's front line which currently rely solely on Thiago Furtuoso after his long-term injury. Ondoua made his debut on 3 May 2017 in a match against Sriwijaya. On 19 June 2017, Ondoua scored his first goal for Bhayangkara against Persiba Balikpapan.

PSM Makassar
In January 2018, Ondoua signed for PSM Makassar in Indonesian Liga 1. He made his debut on 25 March 2018 in a match against PSIS Semarang in the Liga 1. On 21 April 2018, Guy Junior scored his first goal for PSM against PS TIRA in the 36th minute at the Andi Mattalatta Stadium, Makassar.

Borneo
He was signed for Borneo to play in Liga 1 in the 2020 season. Guy Junior made his debut on 1 March 2020 in a match against Persija Jakarta. This season was suspended on 27 March 2020 due to the COVID-19 pandemic. The season was abandoned and was declared void on 20 January 2021. On 4 September 2021, Guy Junior scored his first goal for Borneo against Persebaya Surabaya in the 61st minute at the Wibawa Mukti Stadium, Bekasi.

Barito Putera
In January 2022, Guy signed a contract with Liga 2 club Barito Putera. Guy made his league debut in a 3–0 lost against Bali United as a starter on 9 January 2022 at the Ngurah Rai Stadium, Denpasar. On 18 January 2022, Guy Junior scored his first goal for Barito Putera against Persikabo 1973 in the 43rd minute at the Kompyang Sujana Stadium, Denpasar.

Personal life
Guy Junior was born in Douala, Cameroon. In July 2016, he was naturalized and became a citizen of Indonesia.
Guy Junior married a woman from Indonesia in 2006, Cholin Misgetawati. 
They have three sons named Moise, Aaron, Ezekiel.

Honours

Club
TSW Pegasus
 Hong Kong Senior Challenge Shield: 2008-09

Bhayangkara
 Liga 1: 2017

PSM Makassar
 Piala Indonesia: 2019

References

External sources
 Guy Junior Ondoua at HKFA
 

1986 births
Living people
Indonesian Christians
Cameroonian footballers
Indonesian footballers
Cameroonian expatriate footballers
Expatriate footballers in Hong Kong
Expatriate footballers in Indonesia
Cameroonian expatriate sportspeople in Hong Kong
Cameroonian emigrants to Indonesia
Indonesian people of Cameroonian descent
Naturalised citizens of Indonesia
Association football forwards
Indonesian Premier Division players
Gresik United players
Persidafon Dafonsoro players
Persebaya Surabaya players
Hong Kong First Division League players
TSW Pegasus FC players
Tai Po FC players
Liga 2 (Indonesia) players
Liga 1 (Indonesia) players
Persiwa Wamena players
PSS Sleman players
Madura United F.C. players
Bhayangkara F.C. players
PSM Makassar players
Borneo F.C. players
PS Barito Putera players
Sriwijaya F.C. players